São José de Areal is a village in Salcete, Goa. It is located to the south-east of Margão and falls under Margao metropolitan region in South Goa district.

Demographics
, São José de Areal had a population of 8,352. Males constituted 51% of the population and females 49%. São José de Areal has an average literacy rate of 63%, higher than the national average of 59.5%: male literacy was 68%, and female literacy was 58%. In São José de Areal, 13% of the population was under 6 years of age.

References

Cities and towns in South Goa district